Georgia's 33rd Senate District elects one member of the Georgia Senate. Its current representative is Democrat Michael Rhett.

References

External links 

Georgia Senate districts